Old North Tower (or Old North) is the oldest building on the University of Central Oklahoma campus in Edmond, Oklahoma, and the oldest building of higher education in the state of Oklahoma. Originally built in 1892, it was the first permanent building on the Territorial Normal School campus.

History
The construction of Old North, designed by J.G. Haskell began in the summer of 1892, and classes began in January 1893.

Early in Old North's history the building was deemed unsafe. In 1911, the structure was set for demolition, but instead was renovated.

The most major milestone for Old North was when the building was added to the National Register of Historic Places in 1971.

Renovation
The university closed Old North in 2001 because of structural and safety issues. Old North was left dormant until funds could be raised to renovate the building. The $11 million of renovations include the addition of an east wing, an amphitheater, additional maintenance space, and elevators to make the building ADA compliant. The building was the centerpiece of UCO's Always Central campaign to raise $40 million; however, the renovations were scheduled to be the last portion of the campaign. In 2017, the building officially reopened.

References

External links 

 University of Central Oklahoma facilities profile

University of Central Oklahoma
School buildings on the National Register of Historic Places in Oklahoma
Buildings and structures in Oklahoma County, Oklahoma
National Register of Historic Places in Oklahoma County, Oklahoma